Brandon Roberto Palacios Bustamante (born 26 March 1998) is a Peruvian footballer who plays as a right winger for Peruvian Primera División side Deportivo Binacional.

References

External links
 
 

Living people
Peruvian footballers
1998 births
Sporting Cristal footballers
Universidad Técnica de Cajamarca footballers
Club Deportivo Universidad de San Martín de Porres players
Cusco FC footballers
Peruvian Primera División players
Association football midfielders